The Hurley Group is a large provider of primary care services in London, one of only 3 organisations in England which served more than 100,000 patients in 2014.  In 2012 it ran 13 practices, had 250 employees and provided a variety of NHS services across London.

Dr Clare Gerada is one of four GP partners in the firm. It was noted during her active campaign against the Health and Social Care Act 2012 that the group could face substantial competition from private providers if they were allowed to compete equally to provide NHS services. Other GPs were reported as complaining that the Hurley Group was "swooping in and taking over in areas where it normally has no business".

Expansion of larger organisations like the Hurley Group has been advocated as a means whereby the quality and capacity of primary care services in England could be enhanced, for example by the King's Fund report in 2011. Dr Arvind Madan, Partner and Chief Executive made a presentation to the Nuffield Trust event "Transforming general practice: unlocking the potential" in May 2013.

In June 2014 the group was awarded a five year £17m contract to provide urgent care centres outside Queen Mary’s Hospital and Erith Hospital by Bexley Clinical Commissioning Group.

All Saints Practice, in Poplar, east London, one of the 18 practices in the group, was put in special measures by the Care Quality Commission in April 2017.

In June 2018 the practice announced that it planned to use its eConsult online system for most consultations.  This enables patients to submit their symptoms to a GP electronically, and offers around the clock NHS self-help information, signposting to services, and a symptom checker.  12 GPs are using eConsult and it is planned to recruit 12 more, so patients will only be seen in person where necessary.  340 other practices are also using eConsult, a majority of the 479 GP practices are expected to have implemented an online consultation system by April 2018.

During the COVID-19 pandemic in England the practice  reorganised itself into “hot” and “cold” sites, working 12-hour days and offered face to face appointments all the way through.

References

External links
 Hurley Group

General practice organizations
Private providers of NHS services
Medical and health organisations based in England